The 2017–18 UEFA Youth League was the fifth season of the UEFA Youth League, a European youth club football competition organised by UEFA.

Barcelona won their second Youth League title following a win over Chelsea in the final.

Red Bull Salzburg were the defending champions, but were eliminated in the round of 16. Starting from this season, the UEFA Youth League title holders were given an automatic berth in the Domestic Champions path if there was a vacancy.

Teams
A total of 64 teams from 43 of the 55 UEFA member associations entered the tournament, with Albania, Latvia and Luxembourg entering for the first time. They were split into two sections:
The youth teams of the 32 clubs which qualified for the 2017–18 UEFA Champions League group stage entered the UEFA Champions League Path. If there was a vacancy (youth teams not entering), it was filled by a team defined by UEFA.
The youth domestic champions of the top 32 associations according to their 2016 UEFA country coefficients entered the Domestic Champions Path. If there was a vacancy (associations with no youth domestic competition, as well as youth domestic champions already included in the UEFA Champions League path), it was first filled by the title holders should they have not yet qualified, and then by the youth domestic champions of the next association in the UEFA ranking.

Notes

Squads
Players must be born on or after 1 January 1999, with a maximum of three players per team born between 1 January 1998 and 31 December 1998 allowed.

Round and draw dates
The schedule of the competition is as follows (all draws are held at the UEFA headquarters in Nyon, Switzerland, unless stated otherwise).

Notes
For the UEFA Champions League Path group stage, in principle the teams play their matches on Tuesdays and Wednesdays of the matchdays as scheduled for UEFA Champions League, and on the same day as the corresponding senior teams; however, matches may also be played on other dates, including Mondays and Thursdays.
For the Domestic Champions Path first and second rounds, in principle matches are played on Wednesdays (first round on matchdays 2 and 3, second round on matchdays 4 and 5, as scheduled for UEFA Champions League); however, matches may also be played on other dates, including Mondays, Tuesdays and Thursdays.
For the play-offs, round of 16 and quarter-finals, in principle matches are played on Tuesdays and Wednesdays of the matchdays as scheduled; however, matches may also be played on other dates, provided they are completed before the following dates:
Play-offs: 8 February 2018
Round of 16: 28 February 2018
Quarter-finals: 16 March 2018

UEFA Champions League Path

Group A

Group B

Group C

Group D

Group E

Group F

Group G

Group H

Domestic Champions Path

First round

Second round

Play-offs

Knockout phase

Bracket (round of 16 onwards)

Round of 16

Quarter-finals

Semi-finals

Final

Statistics
Notes

Top goalscorers

Top assists

References

External links
UEFA Youth League (official website)
UEFA Youth League history: 2017/18

 
Youth
2017-18
Uefa Youth League
Uefa Youth League